Jerry Lee Pender (born February 12, 1950) is an American former professional basketball player. He played in 11 games for the San Diego Conquistadors of the American Basketball Association in the first part of the 1973–74 season. He recorded 27 points, 5 rebounds, and 4 assists in his brief career.

References

1950 births
Living people
American men's basketball players
Basketball players from California
Chicago Bulls draft picks
Denver Rockets draft picks
Fresno State Bulldogs men's basketball players
Junior college men's basketball players in the United States
Merced College alumni
San Diego Conquistadors players
Shooting guards